Princess Alexandra Elli Francisca Maria of Greece, known professionally as Alexandra Mirzayantz (born 15 October 1968) is a Greek artist, art collector, arts patron, and child life specialist. As the daughter of Prince Michael of Greece and Denmark, she is a member of the Greek royal family and a relative of the Danish royal family. A morganatic descendent of the House of Glücksburg, she is not a Danish princess nor is she entitled to the style Royal Highness as other members of the Greek royal family are. She was born a princess of Greece entitled to the style Your Highness, and was excluded from the line of succession to the Greek throne. She is a second cousin of Constantine II of Greece, who reigned as King of the Hellenes until the monarchy was abolished in 1973.

Early life and family 
Princess Alexandra was born in Athens on 15 October 1968. She is the daughter of the historian Prince Michael of Greece and Denmark and the artist Marina Karella. She is the older sister of Princess Olga. She is a great-granddaughter of George I of Greece and Olga Constantinovna of Russia. She is also a great-granddaughter of Prince Jean, Duke of Guise and a great-great-granddaughter of Christian IX of Denmark. As Princess Alexandra's parents' marriage is morganatic, and therefore non-dynastic, she is a Greek princess by birth but not a Danish princess, uses the style Her Highness instead of Her Royal Highness, and is excluded from the line of succession to the former Greek throne.

On 29 July 1973, Princess Alexandra's second cousin, Constantine II of Greece, was deposed and the Greek monarchy was abolished.

Career 
Princess Alexandra is a certified child life specialist.

In 2018, she graduated with a master's degree in fine arts from the New York Academy of Art. She works as a painter and portraitist. She has cited Melina Mercouri, Rita Wilson, Niki de Saint Phalle, Willem Claesz. Heda, and Rembrandt as her artistic inspiration. In 2020, she painted portraits of National Health Service members as part of a fundraising inititative. In 2022 she sold paintings as part of a benefit for visual aids.

Princess Alexandra and her husband are patrons of the New York art scene. She is also an art collector. She owns a portrait of her grandfather, Prince Christopher of Greece and Denmark, painted by Philip de László in 1919, as part of her collection.

Personal life 
Princess Alexandra is married to perfumer Nicolas Mirzayantz since 27 June 1998 in Torcello. They have two children, Tigran (born 2000) and Darius (born 2002).

He is vice president of global business development for International Flavors & Fragrances.

She is active in the New York social scene. In 2007, she was inducted into the International Best Dressed Hall of Fame List.

The  family  lives  in  New  York  City.

Patronages 
 Founding  board  member  of  "Room  to  Grow",  which  helps poor  children  "throughout  their  critical  first  three years  of  development";  

 Venetian  Heritage;  

 Volunteers at  Bellevue  Hospital.

References 

Living people
1968 births
21st-century art collectors
21st-century Greek painters
Greek art collectors
Greek people of Danish descent
Greek people of French descent
Greek people of Russian descent
Greek princesses
Greek socialites
Greek women painters
House of Glücksburg (Greece)
Nobility from Athens
Women art collectors
Women in medicine